Clifton Wharton may refer to:

Clifton Reginald Wharton Sr. (1899-1990), American lawyer and ambassador
Clifton R. Wharton Jr. (born 1926), deputy Secretary of State in Clinton Administration